Sir George Clifford, 3rd Earl of Cumberland, 13th Baron de Clifford, 13th Lord of Skipton,    (8 August 155830 October 1605), was an English peer, naval commander, and courtier of Queen Elizabeth I of England. He was notable at court for his jousting, at the Accession Day Tilts, which were highlights of the year at court.  Two famous survivals, his portrait miniature by Nicholas Hilliard (c. 1590, now National Maritime Museum) and a garniture of Greenwich armour (now at the Metropolitan Museum of Art), reflect this important part of his life. In contrast, he neglected his estates in the far north of England and left a long succession dispute between his heirs.

Early life and wardship

George Clifford was born on 8 August 1558 at Brougham Castlein Westmorland, the son and heir of Henry Clifford, 2nd Earl of Cumberland (d. January 1570) by his second wife, Anne Dacre, daughter of William Dacre, 3rd Baron Dacre. 

The Barons de Clifford, a junior branch of the Clifford feudal barons of Clifford of Clifford Castle in Herefordshire, had established themselves in the late 13th century at Appleby Castle in Westmorland, in the north of England.

George succeeded as Earl of Cumberland and Baron de Clifford when his father died in 1570, leaving George a minor, aged 12. His valuable wardship and marriage was granted by Queen Elizabeth I to Francis Russell, 2nd Earl of Bedford, KG (died 1585), who in 1577, married George off to his daughter Lady Margaret Russell (1560–1616). The marriage had been arranged in their infancy by their respective fathers, which later did not prove to be a happy one.

Life at court
Life at court meant that George spent an increasing amount of time in southern England, away from his family's estates. As a result, Brougham Castle, one of his properties in the north, was neglected and abandoned. Although in 1589, he built the original Londesborough Hall, an Elizabethan country house located in East Riding of Yorkshire. George's fellow courtier commented on his northern upbringing, writing to the steward of Robert Devereux, 2nd Earl of Essex, that he disliked Clifford as "the rudest Earll by reson of his northerly bringen up".

George Clifford was described as a man of great personal beauty, strong and active, accomplished in all knightly exercises, splendid in his dress, and of romantic valour. On the other hand, he was a gambler and a spendthrift, a faithless husband, and later, for several years before his death, was separated from his wife.

Queen's Champion and KG

Clifford rose in the world as an accomplished jouster, and became Queen Elizabeth's second Champion on the retirement of Sir Henry Lee of Ditchley. A portrait miniature by Nicholas Hilliard, around 1590, commemorates the appointment, showing him in tilting attire with the Queen's glove, set in diamonds, pinned as a plume to his hat as a sign of her favour. The Queen made him a Knight of the Garter in 1592, and he sat as a Peer in the trial of Mary, Queen of Scots. Clifford was also involved in the formation of the East India Company.

Naval career
Clifford was a man of irregular life, and having run through a great part of his very handsome property, seized on the opportunity offered by the war with Spain to re-establish himself. In 1588, he commanded the galleon Elizabeth Bonaventure in the Anglo-Spanish War, during which he had had some success. His portrait was included in the Armada Tapestries.

He led and invested in a number of expeditions, but many were turned back due to storms or lack of prizes. His first success was an expedition to the Azores in 1589, taking a number of Portuguese and Spanish prizes. He suffered losses in the Battle of Berlengas Islands in 1591, and in 1592 he helped to prepare an expedition with Walter Raleigh, which led to the Battle of Flores, and the capture of the richly laden Portuguese ship, Madre de Deus, off Flores Island in the Azores. At the end of 1593, Clifford financed three ships for a further expedition to the Azores, which resulted in the action of Faial between the English and a joint Iberian/Portuguese fleet.

Clifford later commissioned the building of his own ship, the 38-gun Scourge of Malice. During the Battle of San Juan in 1598, he achieved fame for having briefly captured Fort San Felipe del Morro, the citadel protecting San Juan, Puerto Rico. Clifford and his force of men had arrived in Puerto Rico on 15 June 1598, but by November of that year had fled the island due to severe bouts of dysentery which started to plague his men.

Clifford was often spoken of as a sort of nautical Quixote, a title curiously unsuitable to the courtier, gambler, and buccaneer, in all of which guises history presents him. His love of adventure was strong, and he staked his money on the success of his cruises in much the same spirit that he did on the speed of his horses or the turn of his dice. And he spared his body no more than his purse. His courage was unimpeachable, and the temper which he showed in times of difficulty, won him both credit and popularity. All the great wealth he gained from his buccaneering, he lost in jousting and horse racing, and was eventually obliged to sell his inherited lands.

Marriage, children and succession dispute

In 1577, George married Lady Margaret Russell (1560–1616), a daughter of his guardian Francis Russell, 2nd Earl of Bedford and Margaret St John. Earl Russell had acquired his valuable wardship, as well as the right to marry George off to whomsoever he chose. By his wife Margaret, George had the following children:
Robert Clifford (21 September 158524 May 1591), died young before the age of 5.
Francis Clifford (15848 December 1589), died young before the age of 5.
Lady Anne Clifford, suo jure 14th Baroness de Clifford (30 January 159022 March 1676), his daughter and sole heiress, and wife of Richard Sackville, 3rd Earl of Dorset.

Clifford's two sons, Robert and Francis, had both died young, before the age of 5, thus his only surviving child and daughter Anne became his sole heiress. She inherited the title Baron de Clifford suo jure, having been created by writ in 1299 to be able to descend in the female line. She also inherited £15,000. The vast majority of his estate, however, Clifford bequeathed to his brother Francis Clifford, 4th Earl of Cumberland, who also inherited the earldom, which by the letters patent of its creation was precluded from passing to a female, as was usual. After lengthy litigation, Clifford's daughter Anne won much of the land, including Brougham and Appleby castles.

The Great Picture is a large triptych group portrait, measuring 8 ft 5" high and 16 ft 2" wide, commissioned in 1646 by Lady Anne Clifford, attributed to Jan van Belcamp (1610–1653).  It formerly hung in Appleby Castle and is now displayed at the Abbot Hall Art Gallery in Kendal, Cumbria. It depicts Lady Anne as a girl, on the left, and as a mature woman, on the right. The central panel shows her parents and her small brothers. The painting is replete with significant elements, referring to her life and to her succession to her paternal inheritance, gained after a lengthy legal dispute, only settled in 1617. The House of Lords postponed the hearing of the matter of the barony, which remained dormant until 1678, when Nicholas Tufton, 3rd Earl of Thanet, was allowed to claim the peerage and become the fifteenth Baron de Clifford.

Death and burial

George Clifford died on 30 October 1605 at the duchy house of the Savoy in London. His body was embalmed and buried in the family vault at Skipton Castle in Craven, Yorkshire, his family seat, where a black marble altar tomb to his memory was erected by his daughter, Lady Anne Clifford. Also, his chest tomb monument survives in Holy Trinity church, Skipton, adjacent to the castle. It is profusely decorated with heraldry, showing the arms of Clifford quartering Vipont (the feudal barons of Appleby, from whom the Cliffords inherited Appleby Castle and vast estates in Westmorland), impaling the arms of Russell as well as the wives of Clifford's paternal predecessors:  Beauchamp, de Roos, Percy, Dacre, Berkeley, Neville, etc.

Suit of armour

George Clifford's tournament armour survives and is considered the finest surviving garniture of the Tudor period. As Queen's Champion, Clifford's armour has been unrivalled in beauty. It was made at the Greenwich armoury established by King Henry VIII, and a drawing of it is included in the Jacob Album, a book of designs for 29 different armours for various Elizabethan gentlemen. Clifford's armour, being part of a garniture, includes many pieces of exchange, including a grandguard, an extra helmet, a shaffron, and several lance guards. These extra pieces allowed the wearer to modify his armour for different forms of tournament combat.

The armour is of blued steel and is etched and inlaid with elaborate gilded designs, incorporating columns of alternating fleurs-de-lis and Tudor roses, with the letter E for Queen Elizabeth I. It is on display in the Armor Court at the Metropolitan Museum of Art in New York, next to the two suits of armour of Sir James Scudamore, which were also made at the Greenwich armoury.

The design of the New York armour is very different to the one he wears in the famous full-length portrait miniature by Nicolas Hilliard, which Hilliard perhaps invented.

In literature
In Virginia Woolf's novel Orlando: A Biography, the "Earl of Cumberland" discovers Orlando and his lover asleep amongst his cargo and believes them to be ghosts sent to punish him for buccaneering. In his terror, the Earl vows to mend his ways and, in repentance, founds a row of almshouses. Although not explicitly stated, the Earl referred to must be the 3rd Earl, due to the relevant action in the novel occurring shortly after the death of Queen Elizabeth I.

Ancestry

References
 vieuxpont.co.uk. Retrieved 28 October 2007

Bibliography

|-

1558 births
1605 deaths
16th-century Royal Navy personnel
3
Knights of the Garter
Lord-Lieutenants of Cumberland
English privateers
Lord-Lieutenants of Northumberland
Lord-Lieutenants of Westmorland
16th-century English nobility
17th-century English nobility
George
High Sheriffs of Westmorland
English people of the Anglo-Spanish War (1585–1604)
Barons de Clifford